Leon Ramos (born 9 November 1984 in Rotterdam) is a Dutch footballer who played for Eerste Divisie clubs FC Dordrecht, FC Omniworld, SC Cambuur and FC Eindhoven during the 2004-2008 football seasons.

References

External links
voetbal international profile

Dutch footballers
Footballers from Rotterdam
FC Dordrecht players
Almere City FC players
SC Cambuur players
FC Eindhoven players
Eerste Divisie players
1984 births
Living people
Association footballers not categorized by position